Ashok Desai is an Indian lawyer.

Ashok Desai may also refer to:

 Ashok Desai (economist) (born 1936), Indian economist
 Ashok Desai (judge) (1942–2006), Indian judge